Märta Allertz (1628 – before 1677), often wrongly referred to as Brita Allerts, was the royal mistress of Charles X Gustav of Sweden. She was the mother of the illegitimate son of Charles X, Gustaf Carlson. The year of her death is unknown: she is last confirmed alive in 1665, and was surely dead by 1677, when her death estate was listed. 

Allertz was the daughter of the wealthy Stockholm city councillor Claes Allerts (d. 1650) and the successful wheat merchant Britta Jacobsdotter. She became introduced for the future Charles X and his siblings because of their parents' business associations: her wealthy parents helped the parents of Charles X economically, and her mother had a business arrangement with John Casimir in which she sold the wheat produced in the Stegeborg County, where John Casimir was the governor. Allertz and Charles had a relationship after his return from Germany in 1646. In 1647 they had a son, Gustaf Carlson. Charles immediately acknowledged their child. He spent his first three years with his mother, was in 1650 entrusted to Magnus Gabriel De la Gardie and ennobled in 1674. 

In contrast to other mistresses of Swedish royalty, Allertz did not marry directly after the relationship was broken. Her mother was granted several sums in the capacity of her guardian. In 1665 Allertz personally was granted eight estates by the Queen Dowager Hedvig Eleonora and she was by then no longer under her mother's guardianship, but married and with children.

Sources 
 Gadd, Pia (Swedish): Frillor, fruar och herrar - en okänd kvinnohistoria (Mistresses, wives and masters - an unknown history of women) Falun 2009

Mistresses of Swedish royalty
1628 births
17th-century deaths